Chunghwa is a premium brand of Chinese cigarettes produced by the Shanghai Tobacco Group, a subsidiary of China Tobacco. The cigarette package design is a bright red color with the Tiananmen and its Huabiao pillars in gold on the front. "Chunghwa", or Zhonghua (/), is one of the common names for China. As a result, advertisements usually use the name as a pun, though this practice has been controversial. For example, the slogan "Love Our Chunghwa" could also translate as "Love Our China" and could therefore be used as an advertisement.

The cigarettes smell like plums and are purported to have been the preferred cigarette brand of Mao Zedong. The Chunghwa brand can be considered to be a status symbol, and the cigarettes are often given as gifts.

History
In May 1949, shortly after the establishment of the Shanghai Municipal People's Government of Shanghai, the Military Control Commission took over the former Chinese national government tobacco company and set up a state-owned Chinese Tobacco Company.

The company solicited in the "Liberation Daily" newspaper suggestions for the official package logo. After the advertisement was published, many people submitted proposals. The accepted design was of the Tiananmen Gate with a dark red background and a gold five-pointed star, the Tiananmen Gate on both sides with two large Chinese tables, painted below the Golden Water Bridge, in the upper middle printed with "Chunghwa cigarettes," the back of the packaging painted with a base Dahua table in the middle printed with "Chunghwa cigarettes."

On February 13, 1951, the Chinese tobacco company in the "Tobacco Daily" published their first advertisement for their brand.

After 1952, the Chinese Tobacco Company was incorporated into the Shanghai Tobacco Company. By March 1953, Chunghwa had a total production of 16,000 boxes.

Limited supply period
Due to the small number of raw materials, Chunghwa production was low during the Cultural Revolution, and its production was lower than the yield of the 1950s.

Open supply
In 1984, the Shanghai Tobacco Monopoly Bureau and the Shanghai Tobacco Company were established for the implementation of unified management and marketing of the tobacco industry in Shanghai. From 1984 to 1992, Chunghwa sold more than 160,000 cigarettes boxes.

In 1997, Chunghwa had an annual output of 10 million boxes. In 2011 there were sales of more than 900,000 cases. Chunghwa high-end market share in China is more than 50% year-round, and cigarette sales in China for many years have elected Chunghwa as the best brand.

Controversy

"I Love China" slogan
The "People's Republic of China Advertising Law" and "Tobacco advertising Interim Measures" on tobacco advertising has been strictly limited, so Shanghai Tobacco Group has been using the slogan "I love China" on large outdoor advertising, set to Tiananmen Square as the background. These ads have the words "Love China" and "Shanghai Tobacco Group" for the inscription. Although Shanghai tobacco Group states that this is a public service ad to promote patriotism and not their products, their intentions continue to be questioned. According to a survey, more than half of the people screened said "Chunghwa" [China] should be the name used for publicity of cigarettes. In Shanghai, more than 95% of the sale of tobacco products at shopping malls, supermarkets, convenience stores have "Love China" on the box.

"China" trademark case
According to the 1993 enactment of the "Trademark Law", with the same or similar name of the country, or the name of the name of the seat of the central government agencies a specific location or landmark, graphical same text and graphics, are not allowed to appear on the label. Chunghwa due to the "Chinese" character and pattern Tiananmen Square, Chinese table, a lawyer pursuant to the courts, and to think that these signs on cigarette use damage the country's image, called for the repeal Shanghai Tobacco Group's "China" trademark. The Beijing First Intermediate People's Court held that "China" trademark in 1952 that the application for registration, and formally registered in 1979, released in early 1982, China's first "Trademark Law", according to the law is not retroactive, the Shanghai tobacco Group's "China" can continue to use the trademark.

Markets
Chunghwa is mainly sold in China, but also was or still is sold in Hong Kong, Singapore, Georgia and the United Kingdom.

Additionally, Chunghwa cigarettes are available in many airport duty-free shops around the world.

See also
 Zhongnanhai
 Double Happiness
 Hongtashan

References

Chinese cigarette brands
China Tobacco